Ganesha Pancharatnam is a stotra composed by Sri Adi Sankara in the 8th century on Lord Ganesha. Ganesha is referred to as Vinayaka in the strota, and the title itself can be translated as "The five jewels in praise of Sri Ganesha". The five jewels are the first five verses, while the sixth verse implores the listener to themselves read or recite the strota and tells them the resulting benefits.

The strota is set in Adi in thisranadai, or eight beats in units of three.

Text

See also
Shloka

References

External links

Hindu texts
Indian literature
Ganesha
Adi Shankara